All the Good Shit: 14 Solid Gold Hits 2000–2008 (known as 8 Years of Blood, Sake and Tears: The Best of Sum 41 2000–2008 in Japan) is a greatest hits album by Canadian rock band Sum 41. The Japanese version was released on November 26, 2008, and the worldwide version was released on March 17, 2009. This is the band's first greatest hits album. It includes singles from each of the band's studio albums, as well as a previously unreleased song, "Always". The release also includes a bonus DVD with all of the band's music videos (excluding "Some Say" and "Handle This").

Track listing

Personnel 
 Deryck Whibley - lead guitar (tracks 5, 8, 10, 11, 15), lead vocals, rhythm guitar, keyboards, piano (all tracks), drums (track 14)
 Cone McCaslin - bass guitar, backing vocals (all tracks)
 Steve Jocz - drums, backing vocals (all tracks), lead vocals (track 3, 14)
 Dave Baksh - lead guitar, backing vocals (all tracks, except 5, 8, 10, 11, 15, 16, 17)
 Tom Thacker - lead guitar, backing vocals (tracks 16, 17)

Production and mixing 
 Tracks 1, 2, 7, 13 produced by Greig Nori
 Tracks 3, 6, 9, 12, 14 produced by Jerry Finn
 Tracks 4 & 10 produced by Greig Nori & Deryck Whibley
 Tracks 5, 8, 11, 15 produced by Deryck Whibley
 Tracks 1, 7, 13 mixed by Andy Wallace
 Tracks 2–4, 6, 9, 12, 14 mixed by Tom Lord-Alge
 Tracks 5, 8, 11 mixed by Chris Lord-Alge
 Track 10 mixed by Jerry Finn
 Track 15 mixed by Deryck Whibley

Release history

Certifications

External links 
 Info (JAPANESE).
 Info (roughly translated to english)
 8 Years of Blood, Sake, and Tears: The Best of Sum 41 2000-2008 on Amazon (Japanese)

References 

2008 greatest hits albums
2009 greatest hits albums
Sum 41 albums
Island Records compilation albums